The Manhattan Club was a nightclub located at 1312 Broadway in East St. Louis, Illinois. The club has a prominent place in Greater St. Louis music history. It is best known for being the club where teenaged Tina Turner met her future husband, bandleader Ike Turner. The building was destroyed by fire in 2010.

History 
In 1954, Ike Turner moved his band, the Kings of Rhythm, from Clarksdale to East St. Louis. There he met a man named Booker Merritt who owned a brick building on Broadway. Turner and his band gut renovated the building and created the Manhattan Club where they would practice and perform. The Manhattan Club was initially a predominantly African-American club. Turner also played at the white clubs in St. Louis such as the Club Imperial, and soon gained a large following from white teenagers. Turner's competition in the St. Louis club scene was musician Chuck Berry who once brought bluesman Muddy Waters to watch Turner perform. Other musicians who performed at the Manhattan Club include Little Milton, Oliver Sain, and Albert King.

Tina Turner (then called Ann Bullock) recalled that she "almost went into a trance" when she first saw Ike Turner perform at the Manhattan Club. One night in 1957, she was given the microphone by his drummer Eugene Washington during an intermission and she sang the B.B. King blues ballad, "You Know I Love You." Impressed by her voice, Turner added her as a featured vocalist with his Kings of Rhythm; they later formed the duo Ike & Tina Turner. East St. Louis poet laureate Eugene Redmond recalled that in the 1950s Tina Turner was a "teeny-bopper and a groupie." She used to hang around the Manhattan while Turner was practicing. Turner's band was very popular and he had a strong following of female admirers. Redmond gave him the nickname "Ike Turner, the Woman Burner" because he was "known to run through women." Tina Turner later wrote a song titled "Club Manhattan," on the Ike & Tina Turner album Nutbush City Limits, as homage to the Manhattan Club.

In 1967, Albert King was performing at the Manhattan Club when promoter Bill Graham offered him $1,600 to play three nights at the Fillmore West in San Francisco.

The club had various names changes over the years, but was last known as the Four Aces. In later years, it housed a liquor store in the front and a bar in the back. The other half of the building was a club. The Disco Riders, a 32-member motorcycle club, owned and operated the club, and on Saturday nights hosted dance parties. The building was vacant when it was destroyed by a fire in 2010.

References 

East St. Louis, Illinois
Nightclubs in Illinois
Music venues in Illinois
Music of St. Louis
Ike Turner